Lance Butters (born 1988) is a German rapper. Born and raised in Friedrichshafen in southern Germany, Butters started rapping in his youth.

Biography
Lance Butters was born in 1988 in the South German town Friedrichshafen. In his childhood, his parents divorced, which he often mentioned in his music. Between 2006 and 2010, he participated in the Reimliga Battle Arena, a German online platform for rap battles. In 2010 and 2011, he participated in the Videobattleturnier (VBT), but lost against Tamo-Flage in 2016 and T-Jey in 2011. In the years, he also released multiple freetracks with the producer Bennett One on YouTube. On 22 December 2011, he released the studio album cooking sum as a member of the Frank Castle Cooking Gang, through Bandcamp. On 27 July 2012, he independently released his first solo project, the selfish EP. In May 2013, he signed with Four Music, through he released the EP futureshit on 12 July 2013. The EP charted at no. 32 for one week on the German Albums Chart, while the same titled single debuted at no. 73 in Austria.

His debut studio album Blaow was released on 8 May 2015 and debuted in the top ten in Germany and Austria. His second album was released on 12 October 2018.

On 20 April 2020, Butters released the single "Therapie" to commemorate the International day for cannabis. The following day, he released his fifth extended play Loner through A Corn Dawg Records. The same day, he announced a tour in Germany and Austria for October 2020, which was postponed due to the COVID-19 pandemic to May/June 2021.

Discography

Studio albums

Extended plays

Singles

References

1988 births
German rappers
Living people
People from Friedrichshafen